Llanddyfrwyr-yn-Edeligion is a village in Monmouthshire, Wales.  In the early dark ages it was associated with King Glywys, his son Edelig after who the village is named, and St. Cybi.

References

villages in Monmouthshire